The Australian Whale Sanctuary was established in 1999 to protect dolphins and whales from hunting in waters within the Australian government's jurisdiction.

The sanctuary includes the whole of the Australian Exclusive Economic Zone (EEZ), which is the area  surrounding the continent of Australia and its external dependencies such as Christmas Island (in the Indian Ocean), Cocos (Keeling) Island, Norfolk Island, Macquarie Island and Heard Island and McDonald Islands, and including the EEZ adjoining the coastline of the Australian Antarctic Territory which is only recognised by the United Kingdom, New Zealand, France and Norway.

The sanctuary is the scene of an ongoing controversy between Australia and Japan over whaling. In 2008 the Federal Court of Australia ruled it was illegal under Australian law for the Japanese whaling fleet to kill whales in the Sanctuary. In 2015 Kyodo Senpaku Kaisha Ltd was found guilty of wilful contempt of court and fined A$1,000,000.

See also 

 Whale watching in Australia
 Whaling controversy

References

External links 
Official webpage
PDF map of the sanctuary

Marine protected areas of Australia
Whale sanctuaries
Cetacean research and conservation
1999 establishments in Australia
Exclusive economic zone of Australia